Ewing Thomas Waddy (October 3, 1910 – January 6, 1993) was an American baseball starting pitcher in the Negro leagues. He played with the Indianapolis ABCs from 1932 to 1933.

References

External links
 and Seamheads

Indianapolis ABCs (1931–1933) players
1910 births
1962 deaths
Baseball players from Tennessee
Baseball pitchers
20th-century African-American sportspeople